Cresera hieroglyphica is a moth of the family Erebidae. It is found in French Guiana, Brazil, Venezuela and Peru.

References

Moths described in 1905
Phaegopterina